Gabriel "Flash" Elorde (March 25, 1935 – January 2, 1985) was a Filipino professional boxer. He won the lineal super featherweight title in 1960. In 1963, he won the inaugural  WBC and WBA super featherweight titles. He holds the record at super featherweight division for the longest title reign, spanning seven years. Elorde is considered one of the best Filipino boxers of all time along with eight-division champion Manny Pacquiao and Pancho Villa, flyweight champion in the 1920s. He was much beloved in the Philippines as a sports and cultural icon, being the first Filipino international boxing champion since middleweight champion Ceferino Garcia.

Fighting style
A southpaw, Flash Elorde was known for his boxing skills and speed. Writer Robert Lipsyte once described his style as the "subtle little temple-dancer moves". He studied Balintawak Eskrima from his father "Tatang" Elorde who was the Eskrima champion of Cebu, from whom he learned his innovative footwork and maneuvers. Elorde's style from eskrima has been adopted by many boxers, including his friend Muhammad Ali, which influenced the out-boxer style of boxing.

Early life
Gabriel Elorde was born in the town of Bogo, Cebu. The youngest of 15 children, he came from a poor family.

Elorde finished only the 3rd grade of his elementary education and was forced to drop out due to extreme poverty. He then began to work as a bearer of bowling balls and, besides this, as a carpenter.

His love for boxing came from a friend, Lucio Laborte, a former professional boxer. Laborte taught him how to box, and Elorde quickly learned the sport and pursued his dream to become a boxer. At the time he was only 16 years old.

Professional career
Elorde made his professional debut at the age of 16 on June 16, 1951, against Kid Gonzaga. The bout was held in Cebu, Philippines. The boxing newcomer stopped his foe in the 4th round.

Within a year, Elorde was able to win the national bantamweight title. His potential was evident: he was a solidly built
southpaw whose major asset was his quick hands and relentless body attack on his opponents.

In his first 14 fights, he suffered 2 defeats and 1 draw before coming into his own. He defeated Tanny Campo and Hiroshi Horiguchi both in 12-round decisions to win the Philippine and Asian bantamweight titles. He also outpointed all-time great world featherweight champion Sandy Saddler in 1955 in a non-title bout.

In 1956, he was given a rematch with Saddler, this time with Saddler's featherweight title on the line. However, Elorde suffered a cut in his eye and lost the fight on a 13th-round TKO. Many boxing experts criticized Saddler, known as a very rough and vicious fighter, for the result of the bout. Jack Fiske of the San Francisco Chronicle wrote: "It was a dirty fight throughout and all the onus must be on the 126-pound champion's skinny shoulders. From this corner, it appeared highly improbable that he could have successfully defended the title ... if he hadn't resorted to all the so-called tricks in and out of the rule book."

He won the world super featherweight title on March 16, 1960, by knocking out the defending world champion Harold Gomes in seven rounds. That night, Elorde ended the country's 20-year world championship drought. The crowd estimated to be around 30,000, inside the newly built Araneta Coliseum, rushed into the ring after seeing Gomes go down to his knees at the one-minute-50-second mark of the seventh round. The event happened two decades after compatriot Ceferino Garcia, known as the father of the 'bolo punch', lost the middleweight division he lorded over until 1940.

Elorde floored Gomes in the second round with a right hook to the head. The Filipino challenger knocked down the 25-year-old Gomes again in the third and in the fifth, sending him over the ring's lower rope at the end of the round. In the next round, Gomes mounted a brief comeback, but at the start of the seventh, Elorde hammered him again, connecting with rights to the head followed by a left to the jaw that sent him down once more. Gomes got up but was floored again after receiving a combination of lefts and rights. He then met a series of combinations that led the referee Barney Ross to count him out. When Gomes recovered, he went to Elorde's corner and whispered: "It was a good fight".

He defended the crown 10 times until June 15, 1967, where he lost a majority decision to Yoshiaki Numata of Japan. This made him the longest-reigning world junior lightweight champion ever (seven years and three months).

Elorde also challenged lightweight Carlos Ortiz for his world title on two occasions. He was stopped both times by Ortiz in the 14th round.

Elorde retired with a record of 88 wins (33 KOs), 27 losses and 2 draws. He is considered the greatest super featherweight champion of all time in WBC history.

Outside the ring
After his retirement, Elorde remained in the Philippines within the public eye. He was a prominent commercial endorser, especially for San Miguel Beer. In fact, his San Miguel Beer TV commercial (together with Bert Marcelo and Rico J. Puno), wherein he famously said the words ".... isang platitong mani" (one plate of peanuts), was recently named as the No.1 Filipino advertisement of all time. Another commercial showed him saying the popular line "Wag namang bara-bara, Bay."

Filmography
The Flash Elorde Story (1961)
Kapag Buhay ang Inutang (1962)
Ang Tatay Kong Kalbo (1963)
Mano-mano (1964)
Palad Ta ang Nagbuot (1969)
Pamilya Dimagiba (1982)

Death
Elorde died of lung cancer on January 2, 1985 (one day after New Year's Day 1985 celebrations) at the age of 49. He was a chain smoker. He was buried at Manila Memorial Park

Legacy
In 1993, he became the first Asian inducted into the New York-based International Boxing Hall of Fame. He was also enshrined into the World Boxing Hall of Fame. Elorde was also voted the 78th best fighter by the Ring Magazine's writers in 2002 when the Ring Magazine's list of the 80 Best Fighters of the Last 80 Years was released.

On March 25, 2010, Elorde's family, headed by his widow Laura, commemorated his 25th death anniversary and 75th birth anniversary. They also celebrated his historical win against defending WBA junior-lightweight champion Harold Gomes that ended the RP's 20-year world championship drought.

Filipino boxers Brian Viloria, Donnie Nietes, Rodel Mayol, Marvin Sonsona and Gerry Peñalosa received an award for their contributions. Z Gorres also attended the event. Manny Pacquiao was also a special guest in the ceremony. The Gabriel "Flash" Elorde Memorial Boxing Awards & Banquet was launched in 2000 honoring the former and current boxers in the Philippines living or posthumously celebrating their victories throughout held every year.

In popular culture
The Elorde Sports Center in Parañaque, founded in 1983 (two years before his death in 1985), was dedicated to him. It hosts boxing matches and future fights. Elorde Boxing Gym is now available aside from Parañaque, also has a branches in Las Piñas, Makati, Alabang, Quezon City, San Juan, Mandaluyong, Taguig, Pasig, Pasay and other Elorde Boxing Gym branches nationwide.

Author James Ellroy, an avid boxing fan, named a character in his novel American Tabloid after Elorde.

Personal life
He was married to Laura Elorde. His sons Gabriel Jr. (Bebot), Marty and Johnny went into the world of boxing as promoters and managers. His daughters, as well as the rest of his family have been in the boxing industry since the death of the great "Flash". As a family, they have expanded the Elorde name into becoming a brand. They have made merchandise and gyms throughout the country. International endeavors are still being considered.

Gabriel's widow Laura Elorde died in 2020.

Professional boxing record

Boxing Hall of Fame

Filipino Hall of Fame Boxers

See also
List of world super-featherweight boxing champions
List of Filipino boxing world champions
Suntukan

References

External links

https://boxrec.com/media/index.php/National_Boxing_Association%27s_Quarterly_Ratings:_1961

Philboxing.com - Gabriel "Flash" Elorde
Elorde Gyms Manila
HBO: Boxing: Feature: Before there was Manny Pacquiao, there was Flash Elorde
Gabriel "Flash" Elorde - IBHOF Biography
Elorde Flattens Gomes to Win Junior Lightweight Ring Title The Day. AP. 17 March 1960.
Elorde Puts Away Gomes In The 1st The Times News. UPI. 18 August 1960.
Gabriel "Flash" Elorde - CBZ Profile

 

|-

|-

|-

1935 births
1985 deaths
Filipino male boxers
People from Bogo, Cebu
Boxers from Cebu
International Boxing Hall of Fame inductees
Bantamweight boxers
Featherweight boxers
Lightweight boxers
World super-featherweight boxing champions
World Boxing Association champions
World Boxing Council champions
The Ring (magazine) champions
Recipients of the Presidential Medal of Merit (Philippines)
Philippine Sports Hall of Fame inductees
Burials at the Manila Memorial Park – Sucat
Deaths from lung cancer in the Philippines